is a Japanese long distance runner. She competed in the women's marathon at the 2017 World Championships in Athletics.

References

External links
 
 

1993 births
Living people
Japanese female long-distance runners
Japanese female marathon runners
World Athletics Championships athletes for Japan
Place of birth missing (living people)